The Doddie Weir Cup is a perpetual rugby union trophy established in 2018 and contested between Scotland and Wales. The cup is named after the former Scotland international lock Doddie Weir who was diagnosed with motor neuron disease in 2016 (he died from the disease in 2022, aged 52), and was created to raise awareness of the illness.

Wales won 21–10 in the inaugural match in Cardiff in November 2018. Scotland are the current holders.

Design

The cup was commissioned jointly by the Welsh Rugby Union and the Scottish Rugby Union and was designed by the Edinburgh silversmiths Hamilton and Inches. Doddie Weir commented on the trophy design, stating that the silversmiths "have done an absolutely fantastic job in making it with some big handles to emulate my massive ears!"

Charity

Weir set up a charity called My Name's Doddie Foundation to help fund treatments for motor neurone disease.

Neither the Welsh Rugby Union nor the Scottish Rugby Union originally intended to contribute any of the gate receipts from the inaugural match to the charity, but pressure from fans and in the media resulted in them eventually donating a six-figure sum.

Summary

Results

 – Six Nations Championship
 – Autumn International

See also

History of rugby union matches between Scotland and Wales

References

Rugby union international rivalry trophies
International rugby union competitions hosted by Wales
International rugby union competitions hosted by Scotland
2018 establishments in Scotland
2018 establishments in Wales
Six Nations Championship trophies
Recurring sporting events established in 2018